Simeon Olasukanmi Oduoye (13 April 1945 – 21 March 2014) was a Nigerian police officer and administrator of Niger State and Ebonyi State. He was elected senator for Osun Central in April 2007 on the People's Democratic Party (PDP) platform.

Background

Simeon Oduoye was born on 13 April 1945. He obtained the West African School Certificate in 1964 from Akinorum Grammar School, Ikirun. He enlisted in the Nigeria Police on 1 July 1965. 
He became an Assistant Inspector General of Police, retiring in 1999.
He was Administrator of Niger and Ebonyi States 1996–1999. He was chairman of NSPRI (2005–2007). He is Chairman and Managing Director of Layo Woodmill Nigeria Ltd.

As administrator of Ebonyi State, one of his first acts was to set up a committee to restructure the state civil service to ensure order, seniority, observance to rules and regulations.
In an October 2009 interview, Senator Julius Agbo cited Oduoye's administration as an example of a very well organised person who tried to establish civil service in Ebonyi state.

Senate career

Simeon Oduoye was elected senator for Osun Central in April 2007 on the (PDP) platform.
He was appointed to committees on Security & Intelligence, Power, Land Transport, Interior Affairs, Drugs Narcotics Anti Corruption and Air Force.

In May 2008, as Vice chairman of the Senate Committee on Security and National Intelligence, Oduoye said the Senate was about to approve the establishment of a special court for financial crimes.

Personal life
He is the father to Abidemi Oduoye, Kayode Oduoye, Olanike Oduoye, Olajumoke Oduoye, Olaoluwa Oduoye and Babatunde Oduoye.

References

1945 births
2014 deaths
Yoruba police officers
Governors of Ebonyi State
Governors of Niger State
People from Osun State
Peoples Democratic Party members of the Senate (Nigeria)
Nigerian police officers
Yoruba politicians
Simeon
21st-century Nigerian politicians